Angels Arc Senior Secondary School (or Angels Arc Central school) is located in Kallummoodu, Kayamkulam, India. It was established in 1989. The school conducts the "Kunjunni Memorial Road Race (4km) Championship" every year in January.

History
The Angels Arc English Medium School was inaugurated in June 1989 by Zachariah Mar Anthonios, Metropolitan of the Orthodox Church. The school is run by the Christian Educational Charitable Society. Er. K. Philip is the manager backed by an executive committee composed of eminent persons from various fields. The school is affiliated to the Central Board of Secondary Education, New Delhi with Reg. No. 930177.

Campus
The nursery section, junior school, the secondary school and the senior secondary are together located in the school's new large campus consisting of the three-story building and playground.

The main building houses four laboratories, a library, a computer lab, a content, administrative offices and +2 classes. Exposure to computers is given from standard I onwards. Internet is also provided to expand their world of knowledge using a computer. The recreation section has facilities for basketball, badminton and volleyball. The school library provides academic resources for students, faculty and administrative staff.

Courses offered 
Lower Kindergarten (LKG) to Plus Two (Class XII) level

Science Stream
 Stream 1 – PCMB – English + Physics + Chemistry + Mathematics + Biology
 Stream 2 – PCMC – English + Physics + Chemistry + Mathematics + Computer Science
 Stream 3 – PCBC – English + Physics + Chemistry + Biology + Computer Science

Commerce Stream
 Stream 4 – English + Economics + Accountancy + Business Studies + Computer Science
 Stream 5 – English + Economics + Accountancy + Business Studies + Mathematics

References

External links 
 Official website

Christian schools in Kerala
Primary schools in Kerala
High schools and secondary schools in Kerala
Schools in Alappuzha district
Educational institutions established in 1989
1989 establishments in Kerala